Baca is a locality in the state of Yucatán, Mexico, head of the homonymous municipality.

Toponymy
The toponymic Baca is the Yucatec Maya word for "water in the shape of a horn".

History
In 1441 following the fall of Mayapan, the area fell within the provinces of Ceh Pech and after the conquest became part of the encomienda system. During the conquest, the batab (chief), Ah-Op-Pech, was baptized and took the name Ambrosio Pech, simultaneously being appointed as governor. He was succeeded by his son Pedro Pech in 1567. In 1704, the encomendero was Pedro Cepeda y Lira II, who was responsible for 1548 native inhabitants.

On 15 October 1881, Baca was granted town status.

Demographics

Local festivals
Every year from 1 to 3 May, Baca holds a fiesta in honor of the Holy Cross. Also in May from the 15 to 19, is an annual festival for San Isidro Labrador.

References

Populated places in Yucatán
Municipality seats in Yucatán